Kawanishi may refer to:

Places
 Kawanishi, Hyōgo
 Kawanishi, Nara
 Kawanishi, Yamagata
 Kawanishi, Niigata – now merged into Tōkamachi

People with the surname
, Japanese painter
, Japanese swimmer
, Japanese idol

Other uses
 Kawanishi Aircraft Company, a former Japanese aircraft manufacturer

Japanese-language surnames